Eolympia (meaning "dawn (Greek word ‘eos’) + Olympic games") is interpreted as an extinct monospecific genus of sea anemone which existed in what is now Ningqiang, Shaanxi Province, China during the lower Cambrian period (Fortunian Stage of the Terreneuvian Series - the lower unit of the Lower Cambrian). Its fossils have been recovered from the Kuanchuanpu Formation. The pedicle (after which E. pediculata is named) is long, suggesting the animal engaged in sexual intercourse, though marked perforations imply that reproduction by transverse fission was also quite likely as a more primitive backup.

The fossil may alternatively represent a scalidophoran worm.

References

Prehistoric Anthozoa genera
Cambrian cnidarians
Fossil taxa described in 2010
Prehistoric animals of China
Fortunian
Fortunian genus first appearances
Fortunian genus extinctions

Cambrian genus extinctions